United Nations Security Council Resolution 1901, adopted unanimously on December 16, 2009, after recalling previous resolutions, including 935 (1994), 1503 (2003) and 1534 (2004), the Council noted that the International Criminal Tribunal for Rwanda will not complete its work in 2010.

The resolution goes to extend the mandate for all trial judges at the Tribunal until 30 June 2010 and appeal judges until 31 December 2012, requesting the President of the Tribunal to submit a schedule of all cases and any extension on the mandate of judges. The Council also temporarily modifies Article 11 of Paragraph 1 of the Statute of the International Tribunal to increase the number of ad litem judges serving at the Tribunal from nine to twelve.

See also
 List of United Nations Security Council Resolutions 1901 to 2000 (2009–2011)
 Rwandan genocide

References
Text of the Resolution at undocs.org

External links
 

 1901
 1901
2009 in Rwanda
December 2009 events